Qu is a Chinese surname. The Chinese family name 屈 is transliterated as Wat in Cantonese Jyutping, Yale, and Hong Kong romanization. It is also transliterated as Qū in pinyin.  The surname Qu (屈) is listed 124th on the famous Song Dynasty book of common Chinese surnames,  Hundred Family Surnames, contained in the verse 熊紀舒屈 (Xiong, Ji, Shu, Qu).

History 
The origin of the Qu (屈) surname is from the Hubei (湖北) region.  Historically, the Hubei region was part of the State of Chu during the Spring and Autumn Period of Ancient Chinese history. The King Wu of State of Chu awarded his son Xia with the Qu Yi as feud to recognize his outstanding service to the court of Chu. The people called Xia "Qu Xia" and the offspring of Xia adopted Qu as their surname.

The royal family of State of Chu was descendants of Zhuanxu, the grandson of Emperor Huangdi (i.e. Yellow Emperor). Therefore, Qu is also the descendant of Emperor Huangdi. During the reign of the Northern Wei dynasty, the people with last name of Qutu (屈突) adopted Qu as their surname.

The most famous individual with surname Qu, is Qu Yuan, the patriotic poet of the State of Chu in the Warring States Period of ancient Chinese history. He is known for his patriotism and contributions to classical poetry and verses, especially through the poems of the Chu Ci and Li Sao anthology. His works is still widely read by many people till this very day. On May 5th of every year Dragon Boat races are held to celebrate the Duanwu Festival across the country and in communities across the world in honor of Qu Yuan.

Romanization 
屈 is also romanized as Wat in the Cantonese  dialect.  In Hong Kong and Macau and among the Chinese diaspora abroad, though, many choose to romanize their name according to their regional pronunciation. Within mainland China and Taiwan, names are written using Chinese characters and are currently romanized using the Hanyu Pinyin, but previously Wade-Giles was used and many people retain names as such.

Notable people 
Notable people with the surname Qu/Wat include:

Historical period (pre-20th century):
Qu Yuan (屈原; 340–278 BC), Chinese poet and minister of Chu during the Warring States period. The Duanwu Festival (Dragon boat festival) is celebrated annually in his honor across China and the world.
Qu Ding (屈鼎; ca.1023–ca. 1056), Chinese master painter of the Song Dynasty.
Qu Dajun (屈大均; 1630–1696), Chinese great litterateur of late-Ming and early-Qing dynasty.
Wat Ngong (屈亞昂;1785–1867), Chinese Protestant convert, evangelist and writer.
Qu Xia (屈瑕, ? - 699 AD)
Qu Yijiu (屈宜臼, ? - ?) 
Qu Wan (屈完, ? - ?)
Modern period (20th century and later):
Qu Yingguang (屈映光; 1883 - 1973), Chinese politician active during the Republican period.
Qu Wu (屈武; 1898 - 1992), Chinese politician who was the Chairperson of the Central Committee of the Revolutionary Committee of the Chinese Kuomintang from 1987 to 1988.
Qu Bochuan (屈伯川; 1909 – 1997), Chinese scholar and educator in China, and principal founder of the Dalian University of Technology.
Teresa Wat (屈潔冰; born 1949 or 1950), Canadian politician, who was elected to the Legislative Assembly of British Columbia in the 2013.
Methodius Qu Ailin (屈蔼林; 1961 - ), Chinese Roman Catholic Bishop of Roman Catholic Diocese of Hunan, China.
Qu Dongyu (屈冬玉; 1963 - ), Chinese biologist who is the current Director General of the UN specialized agency Food and Agriculture Organization.
Qu Zhongheng (屈中恆, 1967 - ?) Taiwanese male actor.
Joey Wat (屈翠容; 1971- ), Chinese CEO of Yum China and KFC China. As of May 2020, she is one of only 37 female CEOs on the Fortune 500. She is ranked as one of the “Top 50 Most Influential Business Leaders in China” and as one of the “Top 25 Most Powerful Women in Business in China” by Fortune Chinese Edition.
Qu Chuxiao (屈楚萧; 1994- ), Chinese actor who is listed as Forbes China's 30 Under 30 Asia 2019 list of influential people.

See also 
 Chinese Surnames
 Han Chinese
 Chinese version of Qu surname: :zh:屈姓

References 

Chinese-language surnames
Individual Chinese surnames